Hugh Lloyd Dales (18 May 1888 – 4 May 1964) was an English first-class cricketer active 1920–30 who played for Middlesex. He was born in Medomsley; died in Whitley Bay.

References

1888 births
1964 deaths
English cricketers
Middlesex cricketers
Marylebone Cricket Club cricketers
Durham cricketers
English cricketers of 1919 to 1945
L. H. Tennyson's XI cricket team
Gentlemen cricketers